Commercial Hotel or The Commercial Hotel may refer to:

in Australia
Commercial Hotel, Albury, New South Wales
Commercial Hotel, Fremantle, Western Australia

in the United States
(by state then city)
 Commercial Hotel, Flomaton, Alabama, (also known as the Hart Hotel) listed on the National Register of Historic Places (NRHP) in Escambia County
 Commercial Hotel (Fort Smith, Arkansas), NRHP-listed in Sebastian County
 Commercial Hotel (Mountain View, Arkansas), NRHP-listed in Stone County
 Commercial Hotel (Granite, Colorado), NRHP-listed in Chaffee County
 Hotel Wapello, Wapello, Iowa, also known as Commercial Hotel, NRHP-listed in Louisa County
Commercial House Hotel, Spring Valley, Minnesota, NRHP-listed in Fillmore County
 Commercial Hotel (Wabasso, Minnesota), NRHP-listed in Redwood County
 Commercial Hotel (Wadena, Minnesota), NRHP-listed in Wadena County
The Commercial Hotel (Verdigre, Nebraska), NRHP-listed in Knox County
 Commercial Hotel (DuBois, Pennsylvania), NRHP-listed in Clearfield County
 Commercial Hotel (Prairie du Chien, Wisconsin), NRHP-listed in Crawford County